The S.T. Zimmerman House was built circa 1870 in Lawrence, Kansas by mill owner S. T. Zimmerman. The Second Empire house is unique in the area for its style. The two-story brick house features a square tower, arched window openings, a bell-cast mansard roof, and extensive wrought iron detailing. The exterior has seen little alteration. The interior is altered in places but substantially intact.

The Zimmerman House was placed on the National Register of Historic Places on September 6, 1974.

References

External links
 

Houses on the National Register of Historic Places in Kansas
Second Empire architecture in the United States
Houses completed in 1870
Houses in Douglas County, Kansas
Historic American Buildings Survey in Kansas
Buildings and structures in Lawrence, Kansas
National Register of Historic Places in Douglas County, Kansas